Peterka is a Slavic surname. Notable people include:

 Carol Peterka (born 1963), American handball player
 JJ Peterka (born 2002), German ice hockey player
 Martin Peterka (born 1995), Czech basketball player
 Primož Peterka (born 1979), Slovenian ski jumper
 Rostislav Peterka (born 1949), Czech-Argentine rower
 Tobias Peterka (born 1982), German politician